Dutlupınar is a village in the District of Ceyhan, Adana Province, Turkey.

References

Villages in Ceyhan District